Yashwant Trivedi is a Gujarati poet, essayist and critic from Gujarat, India.

Life
Yashwant Trivedi was born on 16 September 1934 in Palitana (now Bhavnagar district, Gujarat) to Ramshankar and Rambhaben. His family belonged to Mahuva. He completed B. A. in Economics and Statistics from Samaldas College, Bhavnagar in 1956. He completed M. A. in Gujarati in 1965. He was awarded Ph. D. in 1979 for his thesis, Kavyani Paribhasha. He served as a professor of Gujarati in several colleges of Mumbai. Later he served as the professor and head of the department of Gujarati in the University of Mumbai. He retired from there. He is the president of literature department of Kalagurjari institute.

Works
Trivedi started writing in 1956. He wrote modern poetry. His first poetry collection Kshitijne Vansvan (1971) has songs and non-metrical poetry. It is followed by Pariprashna (1975). Paridevna (1976) and Pashchima has poems written on the occasion of death of his writer friend Priyakant Maniar and his foreign visit respectively. His other poetry collections are Ashlesh (1988), Enu Koi Naam Hot...! (1998), Radhakrishna Geetika (2000), Gopigeet Bhramargeet (2006), Akhkhi Prithvi Taro Prempatra Chhe (1996). Parishesh (1978) has hundred poems selected by Pramodkumar Patel. Pralambita (1981) has 76 poems explained by various critics and edited by Ramesh Shukla.

Grusdain Got (1982) is his travelogue. Thodik Vasant Todak Bhagvanna Ansu (1982) and Vishwa Pravasna Yadgar Prasango (2004) are the collections of narrative essays near to poetry. Aa Rasto Akash Sudhi Jay Chhe? (2003) and Anam Akash (2003) are his other essay collections. Ahimsanu Darshan (1983), Man Ane Parbrahma (1983), Premdharmnu Jagran (1983), Purnatanu Achchadan (1983), Dharm-Adhyatmachintan (2004), Aa Jindagi Paramatmae Lakheli Parikatha (2005) shows him as a thinker and a prose writer. Anadpuram Aavo Chho Ne? (2007) is his novel. Jalvithi (1985) is his short novel exploring love and compassion in aftermath of war. E Sooraj Uge Chhe (1956), Chir Vasant (1960) and Surdasi (1962) are his short story collections. Ashesh Akash (on poets, 1988) and Vishwani Amar Vibhutio (2004) are biographical works.

Kavitano Anandkosh (1970) and Zummaro (1976) are his poetry criticism works for students. Kavyani Paribhasha (1978) is his expansive study on literature. Ishika (1978) and Ashesh Akash (1988) are his works of criticism. Interview (1986) has collections of literary interviews. Bhashavihar (1963) is the work on grammar. Gandhikavita (1969), Swatantryottar Kavita (1973), Ane Sahitya (1975), Sahityakvad (1982), Nagar Jivanna Kavyo (2006) are edited by him.

He translated Pratiyuddhkavyo (Anti-war Poems, 1977), Pablo Neruda ni Kavita (Pablo Neruda's Poetry, 1981) and Antarrashtriya Kavio (International Poets, 1983) in Gujarati. Yashwant Trivedi - Selected Poems (1979), Gujarati: Language and Literature, The Beacon Light are his English works.

Awards
He was awarded Soviet Land Nehru Award in 1978 for Pratiyuddh Kavyo. He was felicitated with Amruta Sahitya Sanman. He was also awarded Kaka Kalelkar Award for the best essays of the decade. He has also received Best Journalist Award, Chandulal Selarka Sahitya-Kala Gaurav Puraskar, Saraswati Samman, National Award of Sursingar Sansad's National Award for post-independence poetry, five Sahitya Akademi Prizes, Kanaiyalal Munshi Award (2010).

Personal life 
He married Jyotsana in Mumbai in 1960 and they have two daughters and a son.

See also
 List of Gujarati-language writers

References

External links 

 Official blog

1934 births
Living people
Gujarati-language poets
Gujarati-language writers
Poets from Gujarat
People from Bhavnagar district
20th-century Indian poets
Novelists from Gujarat
21st-century Indian poets
Indian male poets
Indian editors
Indian male short story writers
20th-century Indian essayists
Indian literary critics
Academic staff of the University of Mumbai
20th-century Indian translators
English-language writers from India
Indian travel writers
20th-century Indian biographers
Male biographers